The Piazza Piemonte (i.e. Piedmont Square) is a square in Milan, Italy. It is served by the nearby Wagner station of Milan Metro Line 1.

References 

Piazzas in Milan